Steven Kampmann (born May 31, 1947) is an American actor, writer, and director. He was born in Philadelphia, Pennsylvania. He is best known for his role as Kirk Devane on the first two seasons of Newhart.

Kampmann also had roles in The Rodney Dangerfield Show: It's Not Easy Bein' Me, L.A. Law, The Richest Cat in the World, Multiplicity, and Analyze That. Additionally, he was a writer for WKRP in Cincinnati.  In 1981, he was nominated for a Primetime Emmy Award for Outstanding Comedy Series for his work on WKRP in Cincinnati. His screenplay credits include Clifford, Back to School, The Couch Trip and Stealing Home.

In 2012, Kampmann wrote and directed BuzzKill, a film about a struggling writer who becomes famous when a serial killer steals his car and the newest draft of his script.

Kampmann is married to actress Judith Kahan and they have four children, Christopher, Robert, William, and Michael.

Writing credits

WKRP in Cincinnati (1978–1982) (TV)
SCTV (1981) (TV)
The Rodney Dangerfield Show: It's Not Easy Bein' Me (1982) (TV)
Back to School (with Harold Ramis, Peter Torokvei, and Will Porter) (1986)
The Couch Trip (with Will Porter and Sean Stein) (1988)
Stealing Home (1992) (with Will Porter) (1988) (also director)
Clifford (1994) (credited as "Bobby von Hayes")
Special Delivery (2000) (story only) (TV)
BuzzKill (2012) (also director)

Acting credits

Newhart (1982–1984) (TV)
The Rodney Dangerfield Show: It's Not Easy Bein' Me (1982) (TV)
Rich Hall's Vanishing America (1986) (TV)
The Richest Cat in the World (1986) (TV)
Club Paradise (1986)
A Tiger's Tale (1987)
I, Martin Short, Goes Hollywood (1989) (TV)
For the Boys (1991)
L.A. Law (1992) (TV)
Stuart Saves His Family (1995)
Multiplicity (1996)
Analyze That (2002)

References

External links

Steven Kampmann on TV.com

1947 births
Living people
American male screenwriters
American male television actors
Male actors from Philadelphia
Writers from Philadelphia
20th-century American male actors
American male television writers
American television writers
Screenwriters from Pennsylvania
Film directors from Pennsylvania